Upper Sandusky Exempted Village School District is a school district in Northwest Ohio. The school district serves students who live in the city of Upper Sandusky, in Wyandot County. The superintendent is Laurie Vent.

Grades 9-12
Upper Sandusky High School

Grades 6-8
Upper Sandusky Middle School

Grades K-5
East Elementary School
South Elementary School
Union Elementary School

External links
District Website

School districts in Ohio
Education in Wyandot County, Ohio